Jean Wilson may refer to:
Jean Moorcroft Wilson (born 1941), British academic
Jean Wilson (speed skater) (1910–1933), Canadian skater
Jean Wilson (politician) (born 1928), Pennsylvania politician
Jean Wilson (editor), editorial collective member of Room of One's Own
Jean Wilson (scientist), elected Member of the National Academy of Sciences (medical physiology and metabolism) in 1983
Jean Wilson, a character in the TV series The Last Train